Johnsonburg Area High School is located in Johnsonburg, Pennsylvania.

Athletics 
Basketball, football, wrestling, volleyball, track and field, golf, and cross country

External links
 

Public high schools in Pennsylvania
Schools in Elk County, Pennsylvania